Zum See is a hamlet in the canton of Valais. The hamlet includes a chapel and a gastronomic restaurant.

Zum See can be reached by foot only, from Zermatt or from the Furi cable car station, located just above the hamlet.

References
Swisstopo topographic maps

Zermatt
Villages in Valais